is the second studio album by Japanese pop band Pizzicato Five. The album was released on September 21, 1988 by CBS/Sony.

On initial release, Bellissima! peaked at number 86 on the Oricon Albums Chart. It was reissued on November 1, 1995. On August 24, 2016, a remastered edition of Bellissima! was released, which reached a new peak of number 39 on the Oricon Albums Chart.

Track listing

Charts

References

External links
 

1988 albums
Pizzicato Five albums
Sony Music Entertainment Japan albums
Japanese-language albums